Paracassina obscura  (common names: Ethiopia striped frog, Boulenger's mountain kassina) is a species of frog in the family Hyperoliidae.
It is endemic to Ethiopian highlands west of the Rift Valley. Its natural habitats are montane grasslands, less commonly forest margins. It is also known from a few clearings in tropical deciduous forest, rural gardens, and urban areas. It could be threatened by habitat loss.

References

obscura
Amphibians of Ethiopia
Endemic fauna of Ethiopia
Taxonomy articles created by Polbot
Amphibians described in 1895